Matos or Mattos may refer to:

Places
 Salir de Matos, a parish in the municipality of Caldas da Rainha, Portugal
 Matos River, a river in Bolivia
 Matos Costa, a municipality in the Brazilian state of Santa Catarina

Other uses
 Matos (surname), a Portuguese surname
 Matoš, a Croatian surname
 Matot or matos or (Hebrew מטות), the 42nd weekly parshah in the cycle of Torah reading
 Matorral or mato, the scrublands, or heaths, of Portugal

See also 
 Mata (disambiguation)
 Matus
 Mato (disambiguation)
 Matto (disambiguation)